Phytomyza horticola is a species of leaf-mining fly in the family Agromyzidae of the order Diptera. For a time it was treated as Chromatomyia horticola, but its original name has been restored after genus Chromatomyia was synonymized with Phytomyza. The species is a pest of high economic importance affecting the vegetable crops in temperate and tropical regions.

Habitat and distribution
Phytomyza horticola is recorded in around 268 genera of 36 families, commonly Brassicaceae, Fabaceae and Asteraceae. The polyphagous pest is distributed in various regions of Africa, Asia, and Europe.

References

Further reading

Chromatomyia horticola (Goureau)

Agromyzidae
Diptera of Europe
Agricultural pest insects
Insects described in 1851